In chess, a windmill (or seesaw) is a tactic in which a piece repeatedly gains  while simultaneously creating an inescapable series of alternating direct and discovered checks. Because the opponent must attend to check every move, they are unable to prevent their pieces from being captured; thus, windmills can be extremely powerful. A windmill most commonly consists of a rook supported by a bishop.

Examples

Torre vs. Lasker 

In the position diagrammed, from the game Carlos Torre–Emanuel Lasker, Moscow 1925, White sacrifices his queen in order to set up the windmill:

 25. Bf6

Black must accept the sacrifice, as his own queen is unprotected, and any attempt to stop the windmill would simply give White the queen.

 25... Qxh5 26. Rxg7+ Kh8 27. Rxf7+

White gives discovered check by the bishop.

 27... Kg8 28. Rg7+ Kh8 29. Rxb7+

White simply repeats the checking cycle, capturing as many pieces as he can with his rook.

 29... Kg8 30. Rg7+ Kh8 31. Rg5+ Kh7 32. Rxh5

White concludes the windmill by taking the black queen. White has emerged with a material advantage, leading to a winning endgame.

Byrne vs. Fischer 

The Game of the Century featured a windmill involving a knight and a bishop. The game continued from the diagrammed position as follows:

 17... Be6!!

Black sacrifices his queen in order to initiate an attack.

 18. Bxb6

Accepting the sacrifice allows Black to set up the windmill.

 18... Bxc4+ 19. Kg1 Ne2+ 20. Kf1 Nxd4+ 21. Kg1 Ne2+ 22. Kf1 Nc3+ 23. Kg1 axb6

Black emerges with an overwhelming advantage.

References 

Chess tactics
Chess terminology